Cheilosia antiqua is a European species of hoverfly.

Description
External images
For terms see Morphology of Diptera
The wing length is 5 ·75-8·25 mm. 
Face with a conspicuous central prominence. Frons and facial prominence undusted. Thorax shining black with fine punctures. Legs entirely black. Part of the antiqua species group and difficult to determine.

 The larva is illustrated by Rotheray (1993)

Distribution
Cheilosia antiqua is a Palearctic species with a limited distribution in Europe Ireland to Central Europe and Southern Europe, Balkans, Greece, European parts of Russia.

Biology
The habitat is deciduous forest and unimproved pasture, including montane and subalpine pasture. Found in clearings and beside tracks in woodland and along old hedgerows. In the open in montane pasture. Flowers visited include Caltha, Cardamine, Fragaria, Iris, Ranunculusand Taraxacum.The flight period is April to June.

References

External links
Biolib

Eristalinae
Insects described in 1822
Diptera of Europe
Taxa named by Johann Wilhelm Meigen